Pinoline is a methoxylated tryptoline (5-methoxytryptoline)  long claimed to be produced in the pineal gland during the metabolism of melatonin, however its pineal occurrence remains controversial. Its IUPAC name is 6-methoxy-1,2,3,4-tetrahydro-β-carboline, usually abbreviated as 6-MeO-THBC, and its more common name is a combination of "pineal beta-carboline".  The biological activity of this molecule is of interest as a potential free radical scavenger, also known as an antioxidant, and as a monoamine oxidase A inhibitor.

Bausch & Lomb filed a patent for a drug delivery device utilizing this molecule, designed to treat various ophthalmic disorders in 2006.

Pharmacology 
One of pinoline's pharmacological properties is its ability to promote neurogenesis in vitro; even at trace concentrations.

Aluminium toxicity causes an increase in lipid peroxidation, with most damage occurring in the brain. A recent review of studies shows pinoline and melatonin to be effective at reducing the lipid peroxidation. Studies included both human and animal subjects. The studies’ results support that pinoline has antioxidant properties.

Lipopolysaccharide is produced by Gram-negative bacteria and stimulates the production of free radicals which in turn cause lipid peroxidation. A recent study compared the effectiveness of melatonin and other similar compounds on the lipopolysaccharide induced lipid peroxidation. The results showed support for pinoline’s ability to reduce damage from lipid peroxidation.  Pinoline was also shown to be more effective than vitamin E at reducing lipopolysaccharide activity in the retina.

Another recent study compared the antioxidant properties of compounds from the tryptophan metabolic pathway in the pineal gland against oxidative damage to the lipids and proteins of synaptosomes. Synaptosomes isolated from rat brains were used in an experiment assessing damage by measuring malondialdehyde, 4-hydroxyalkenal, and carbonyl content in the proteins. Pinoline was shown to be the most powerful antioxidant. These results support the evidence for pinoline’s antioxidant abilities and the potential to protect against oxidative damage.

See also
 Norharmane
 harmane
 beta-Carboline
 Harmala alkaloid

References 

Beta-Carbolines
Phenol ethers
Tryptamines